James Allen Cox (born December 21, 1946) is an American former football tight end who played for the Miami Dolphins for 13 games in 1968. Cox attended Christopher Columbus High School in Miami, FL and played collegiate football at the University of Miami. Cox has since been inducted to both schools respective Hall of Fames.

Jim is married to Grace Cox, together they have two daughters and six grandchildren.

References

Living people
1946 births
American football tight ends
Miami Dolphins players
Miami Hurricanes football players